Fremont High School is a public high school located on 1900 North 4700 West in Plain City, Utah that serves the residents of rural Weber County. This school opened in the fall of 1994. The current principal is Alicia Mitchell. The school was named after the explorer John C. Frémont.

Athletics 
Fremont is a member of the Utah High School Activities Association (UHSAA).
 Utah Region 1 football champions in 2005, 2006, 2010, 2011, 2016, and 2018 
2nd in Utah State Football Championships in 1995, 2010, and 2011
2014 5A Girls' Basketball State Champions (girls' team took 2nd in Dick's Sporting Goods Girl's High School National Championships) 
2018 6A Girls’ Basketball State Champions 
2021 6A Girls' Basketball State Champions 
2020 6A Boys’ Basketball State Champions 
2005 5A Boys' Basketball State Champions
2014 and 2016 5A Girls' Soccer State Runners Up
2014 5A Girls' Volleyball 3rd place
2003 5A Wrestling State Champions
2007 5A Boys' Baseball 3rd place

Choirs
Fremont Choirs are among the best in the state and have made 40 State Festival Appearances. Under the direction of Nathan Geoffrey Anderson six high-ranking choirs are maintained:
Legacy Chamber Choir
A'Capella Choir 
Silver Serenade 
Silver Notes
Men's Chorus
Handbell Choir

Notable alumni/alumnae
David Hale - former NFL offensive lineman, Baltimore Ravens
Nick Vigil - current NFL linebacker for the Arizona Cardinals
Zac Blair  -  Current PGA Professional

Rivalries
Their most notable rivals are fellow Weber County schools Weber High School and Roy High School due to their close proximity and Fremont's subsequent break from Weber, when Fremont was created in 1994. Due to numerous boundary changes, Fremont has received many student from Roy.

References

Public high schools in Utah
Schools in Weber County, Utah